Vadim Sidorov (born April 11, 1959) is a retired male long-distance runner from Russia. He outfinished Britain's Hugh Jones in the final 600 meters to win the 1982 Tokyo International Marathon.

Achievements

External links 

1980 World Marathon Rankings

1959 births
Living people
Soviet male long-distance runners
Russian male long-distance runners